SEDALIB S.A. is a public law firm for water supply and sanitation in the Peruvian city of Trujillo. This company has as main function to provide potable water and sewerage services to Trujillo and other cities in La Libertad Region.

History
Sedalib began operations on February 1, 1977. On May 6, 1993 was registered in the National Superintendency of Tax Administration (SUNAT) of Peru as "Public Law Enterprise" in the category of taxpayer and It was typed with the name of Sedalib SA, the company was assigned  the taxpayer code N° 20131911310. The company had been administrated by a directory not renewed since 2002; In 2012 was elected a new directory for Sedalib.

Composition
Sedalib consists of shares belonging to 12 municipalities of La Libertad Region, municipalities are:

Municipality of Trujillo, is the largest shareholder with 23.765 shares.
Municipality of Victor Larco Herrera
Municipality of Salaverry
Municipality of El Porvenir with 11% of the shares.
Municipality of Pacasmayo 
Municipality of Chepén
Municipality of Ascope

Directory
Sedalib Directory is elected by the general meeting of shareholders and is comprised by 1 representative of the regional government of La Libertad, 1 of the Chamber of Commerce of La Libertad, 1 the College of Engineers of La Libertad and 2 representatives of the municipalities shareholders.

Related Companies
Caja Trujillo, company of banking.

See also
Municipality of Trujillo.
Trujillo
Marinera Festival
Trujillo Spring Festival
Las Delicias beach
Huanchaco
Santiago de Huamán
Victor Larco Herrera District

References

External links
Location of Sedalib in Trujillo (Wikimapia)

Media

Gallery of images
Cultural Promotion Center of Trujillo

Companies based in Trujillo, Peru